is a Japanese former footballer.

Club statistics

References

External links

1988 births
Living people
Association football people from Kumamoto Prefecture
Japanese footballers
J2 League players
Japan Football League players
Sagan Tosu players
Matsumoto Yamaga FC players
Kagoshima United FC players
Association football midfielders